Taglietti is an Italian surname. Notable people with the surname include:

Emanuele Taglietti (born 1943), Italian illustrator
Enrico Taglietti (1926–2019), Italian-born Australian architect

Italian-language surnames